Electron is a two-stage small-lift launch vehicle built and operated by Rocket Lab. The rocket has flown 34 times with 31 successes and 3 failures.

The first flight, known as "It's a Test", launched on 25 May 2017. The mission failed due to a glitch in communication equipment on the ground. Successful follow-on missions, including "Still Testing", "It's Business Time" and "This One's For Pickering", delivered multiple small payloads to low Earth orbit. The 13th mission, "Pics Or It Didn't Happen", failed during flight. Rocket Lab subsequently returned to flight, launching the 14th mission two months later. The 20th mission, dubbed "Running Out Of Toes", experienced a failure just right after second stage ignition. Flight 26 was the first Electron flight to attempt a full catch recovery using a mid-air helicopter catch.

Launch statistics

Launch outcomes

Launch sites

Booster tests and recoveries

Rocket configurations

Past launches

2017–2018 
Electron experienced its first successful launch in January 2018, and launched their first mission for NASA in December 2018.

2019 
First launch for the U.S. Air Force in May.

2020 
First launch for the National Reconnaissance Office in January 2020.

First launch of Photon kickstage in August 2020.

2021 
First launch for US Space Force in July 2021.

2022

2023

Upcoming launches 
In July 2019, Rocket Lab expected to have launches every two weeks in 2020. In June 2020, with a new Electron launch vehicle built every 18 days, Rocket Lab was planning to deliver monthly launches for the remainder of 2020 and into 2021, including the company's first launch from Wallops LC-2 in 2021 and a mission to the Moon for NASA aboard Electron and Rocket Lab's spacecraft bus platform Photon in 2021.

2023

2024

2025

See also 

Electron (rocket)
Falcon 1
List of Falcon 1 launches
List of Vega Launches
Vega (rocket)
Rocket Lab
Neutron (rocket)

References

External links 
 Electron Website
 Rocket Lab Completed Launches
 Rocket Lab Next Mission

Rocket Lab
Electron